The 1990 Philippine Basketball Association (PBA) Third Conference was the third and last conference of the 1990 PBA season. It started on September 30 and ended on December 20, 1990. The tournament is a two-import format, which requires each team to have two American reinforcements.

Format
The following format will be observed for the duration of the conference:
The teams were divided into 2 groups.

Group A:
Shell Rimula X
Pepsi Hotshots
Presto Tivolis
San Miguel Beermen

Group B:
Alaska Air Force
Añejo Rum 65ers
Purefoods Hotdogs
Sarsi Sizzlers

Teams in a group will play against each other twice and against teams in the other group once; 10 games per team; Teams are then seeded by basis on win–loss records. Ties are broken among point differentials of the tied teams. Standings will be determined in one league table; teams do not qualify by basis of groupings.
The top five teams after the eliminations will advance to the semifinals.
Semifinals will be two round robin affairs with the remaining teams. Results from the elimination round will be carried over. A playoff incentive for a finals berth will be given to the team that will win five of their eight semifinal games.
The top two teams (or the top team and the winner of the playoff incentive) will face each other in a best-of-five championship series. The next two teams will qualify for a best-of-three playoff for third place.

Elimination round

Team standings

Semifinals

Team standings

Cumulative standings

Semifinal round standings:

Finals berth incentive playoff

Finals berth playoff

Third place playoffs

Finals

References

External links
 PBA.ph

PBA Third Conference
Third Conference